Leucanopsis ochracea is a moth of the subfamily Arctiinae. It was described by Heinrich Benno Möschler in 1883. It is found in Suriname.

References

ochracea
Moths described in 1883